Dadu he is a 1980 Chinese war film directed by Nong Lin. The film tells the story of the 1935 crossing of the Dadu River by the Red Army.

Cast and crew
Xuecheng Fu as Liu Bocheng
Shi Han as Mao Zedong
Huaizheng Liu as Zhu De
Hengduo Zhao as Chiang Kaishek
Shenqiu Zhao as Zhou Enlai

The theme song was sung by Wen Kezheng.

References

External links

1980 films
1980s war films
1980s Mandarin-language films
Chinese war films